The discography of Big Time Rush, an American pop group, consists of three studio albums, three extended plays, ten singles, 21
music videos, eight promotional singles and 23 other charted songs. 

The group's first album BTR was released on October 11, 2010. It has been certified platinum by the RIAA. The album peaked at number three on Billboard 200 and their single "Boyfriend", peaked at number 72 on US Billboard Hot 100. The song is certified platinum in the United States. Their second album Elevate peaked at number 12 on Billboard 200 and is certified gold by RIAA. Their single "Windows Down" peaked at number 97 on Billboard Hot 100. In 2012 the band released a soundtrack, Big Time Movie Soundtrack for their film Big Time Movie. The soundtrack  peaked at 44 on Billboard 200. Their third album 24/Seven peaked at number four on Billboard 200. As of 2019, the band has sold over 5.8 million songs and albums in the US according to Luminate Data.

Albums

Studio albums

Compilation albums

Video albums

Extended plays

Singles

Promotional singles

Other charted songs

Music videos

Notes

References

	

Discography
Discographies of American artists
Pop music group discographies